Michael Ketchum is an American football coach. He is an assistant coach at Bluefield College in Bluefield, Virginia. Ketchum served as the head football coach at Guilford College in Greensboro, North Carolina from 1991 to 2004, compiling a record of 53–85.

References

Year of birth missing (living people)
Living people
American football guards
Bluefield Rams football coaches
Carson–Newman Eagles football coaches
Florida Gators football coaches
Guilford Quakers athletic directors
Guilford Quakers football coaches
Guilford Quakers football players
Hampton Pirates football coaches
Winston-Salem State Rams football coaches
High school football coaches in Florida